İdris Güllüce (born 11 February 1950) is a Turkish civil engineer and politician who served as the Minister of Environment and Urban Planning of Turkey between 2013 and 2015. As a member of the Justice and Development Party (AKP), he served as a Member of Parliament for İstanbul's first electoral district between 2007 and November 2015.

Early life
İdris Güllüce was born to Hüseyin Güllüce and his wife Sıddıka in Hasankale (today Pasinler) of Erzurum Province on 11 February 1950.

He was educated in civil engineering at Yıldız Technical University in Istanbul and went on to study Organization Management at Gebze Institute of Technology earning a Master's degree.

Güllüce is married and has five children.

Career

Profession
After working as an engineer and manager at construction sites in Libya, Güllüce became business partner of a company, and served there as managing director.

Politics
He entered politics at regional level. Güllüce was elected Mayor of Tuzla municipality in Istanbul serving three legislative terms. Güllüce was member of the city council in Üsküdar and deputy chairman of the Istanbul Metropolitan city council. He published a book entitled "Problems of Regional Governments and Their Solutions".

Güllüce was elected into the Grand National Assembly of Turkey in the 2007 general election as an MP from Istanbul Province. He was re-elected a second time into the parliament in the 2011 general election. Between 2009 and 2013, he served as the chairman of the parliamentary Public Works, Transportation and Tourism Commission.

On 26 December 2013, İdris Güllüce assumed office as Minister of Environment and Urban Planning, succeeding Erdoğan Bayraktar during Erdoğan's cabinet reshuffle with ten new names announced the day before, on 25 December, following the 2013 corruption scandal in Turkey.

Legacy
A cultural complex opened in 2005 and featuring a theatre capable of 460 spectators, the Tuzla İdris Güllüce Cultural Center, is named in his honor.

References

1950 births
People from Pasinler
Yıldız Technical University alumni
Turkish civil engineers
Gebze Institute of Technology alumni
Turkish expatriates in Libya
Justice and Development Party (Turkey) politicians
Deputies of Istanbul
Ministers of Public Works of Turkey
Living people
Mayors of places in Turkey
Members of the 25th Parliament of Turkey
Members of the 24th Parliament of Turkey
Members of the 23rd Parliament of Turkey
Members of the 63rd government of Turkey